Tara Kamala Slone (born September 7, 1973) is a Canadian rock vocalist, actress and television personality.

Early life and education
Slone was born in Montreal, Quebec, and raised in Wolfville and Halifax, Nova Scotia. Her stepfather Dr. Tomacz Pietrzykowski was the Dean of the School of Computer Science at Acadia University. She began pursuing classical voice training at the age of 12 with the goal of becoming an opera singer. Her first job was at a Second Cup in Halifax when she was in high school as a barista for a few months before working at Sam the Record Man. She connected with music lovers and indie musicians, which she credits as influencing her taste in music. At the age of 18, she attended first Dalhousie University and then Concordia University to pursue a degree in music. While at Concordia, she switched her aspirations to acting and rock music, and subsequently moved to Toronto, Ontario.

Acting career
In the mid-1990s, Slone played Columbia in the theatre version of The Rocky Horror Picture Show in front of sold-out crowds when it stopped at the Grand Theatre in Kingston, Ontario. In 2016, Slone appeared on stage at the Stratford Festival in the play The Hypochondriac.

In 1998, Slone landed a recurring role in La Femme Nikita. She appeared in three episodes. In 2008, she appeared in an episode of the second season of The Border, titled "Prescriptive Measures", as an American pop star who dies early on in the episode, which sparks the main plot of the episode.

Music career
In 1996, Slone became the lead singer of Joydrop after discovering a wanted ad for a singer in the magazine Now. By 1997, Joydrop had a record deal and released two albums. The band had chart hits in Canada with the singles "Beautiful" and "Sometimes Wanna Die," (which also reached #20 on the American Billboard Alternative chart) and was nominated for a Juno Award.

Since the breakup of Joydrop, Slone worked on a solo album with Jordon Zadorozny. Her latest album, Just Look Pretty and Sing, was released on March 6, 2007, but was completed before appearing on the reality show Rock Star INXS in 2005. Singles released include "My Little Secret", "We Were Stars" and "The Perfect Girl." Joydrop reunited on April 2, 2017, edition of Hometown Hockey in Guelph, Ontario with Slone performing "Beautiful".

Slone competed on Rock Star INXS in 2005, a reality show that sought to find a replacement lead singer for the band INXS. She was the sixth person eliminated from the competition. She previously resided in Toronto, sharing a house with fellow Rock Star INXS contestant Suzie McNeil. The two appeared in an episode of MTV Cribs, giving viewers a tour of their house.

Broadcasting career
From August 9, 2010, to August 28, 2015, Slone served as the host of Breakfast Television on Citytv Calgary.

Beginning in 2014, Slone joined Sportsnet, acting as an on-site co-host for its new Sunday-night Rogers Hometown Hockey broadcasts alongside Ron MacLean. The show was cancelled in 2022 and Slone parted ways with Sportsnet.

In 2020, Slone was named host of a new weekly Sportsnet docuseries called Top of Her Game, which focuses on women's rights through interviews with female athletes, builders and executives. In the same year she was host of the summer concert series Budweiser Stage at Home for the Citytv network, for which she received a Canadian Screen Award nomination for Best Host in a Talk Show or Entertainment News Series at the 9th Canadian Screen Awards. In 2022, she accepted a position with the NHL's San Jose Sharks as a content contributor, and has also joined NBC Sports Bay Area on their Sharks broadcasts.

Personal life
She is separated and has a daughter. Slone now lives in California with former NHL defenceman Dan Boyle.

Filmography

Television

References

External links

1973 births
Living people
Canadian alternative rock musicians
Canadian women rock singers
Canadian women television hosts
Musicians from Halifax, Nova Scotia
Musicians from Montreal
Musicians from Toronto
Participants in American reality television series
21st-century Canadian women singers